Ultimate Marvel, later known as Ultimate Comics, was an imprint of comic books published by Marvel Comics, featuring re-imagined and modernized versions of the company's superhero characters from the Ultimate Marvel Universe. The imprint ran from 2000 to 2015, starting with the Ultimate Spider-Man series and ending with the Ultimate End series.

Ongoing and limited series

Titles in this section are organized by approximate publication date and line title.

Ultimate Marvel (2000 - 2009)

Ultimate Comics

Ultimate Comics: Reborn

Ultimate Marvel NOW! (2014 - 2015)

Crossovers
Age of Ultron #10 (2013)
All-New All-Different Avengers #1 (2015, a FCBD issue, featuring Miles Morales in "All-New All-Different" Post-Secret Wars single Marvel Universe)
All-New X-Men #31-36 (2014–2015)
Avengers, Volume 5, #41-42, 44 (2015)
Deadpool, Volume 3, #45 (a.k.a. Volume 1, #250, 2015)
Secret Wars (2015-2016)
Secret Wars #0-9 (2015-2016, the zero issue is a FCBD one)
Battleworld: Thors #1-4 (2015, the Secret Wars tie-in, featuring Ultimate Thor)
Spider-Men #1-5 (2012)
Spider-Men II #1-5 (2017–18)
Spider-Verse (2014–2015)
Amazing Spider-Man, Volume 3, #9-15 (2014–2015)
Scarlet Spiders #1-3 (2014–2015)
Spider-Verse #1-2 (2014–2015)
Spider-Verse Team-Up #2 (2014)
Spider-Woman, Volume 5, #3 (2015)
Squadron Supreme, Volume 3, #1-12 (2008-2009)
Battleworld: Ultimate End #1-5 (2015)
Ultimates 2  #8-9, 100 (2017)
Venom Vol 4  #26, 200 (2020–21)

Annuals
The Ultimates Annual #1 (Written by Mark Millar and penciled by Steve Dillon, 2005)
The Ultimates Annual #2 (Written by Charlie Huston and penciled by Mike Deodato and Ryan Sook, 2006)
Ultimate Captain America Annual #1 (Written by Jeph Loeb and penciled by Marko Djurdjevic and Rafa Sandoval, 2008)
Ultimate Fantastic Four Annual #1 (Written by Mark Millar and penciled by Jae Lee, 2005)
Ultimate Fantastic Four Annual #2 (Written by Mike Carey and penciled by Stuart Immonen and Frazer Irving, 2006)
Ultimate Fantastic Four/X-Men Annual #1 (Written by Aron Coliete and Joe Pokaski and penciled by Brandon Peterson and Eric Nguyen, 2008)
Ultimate Hulk Annual #1 (Written by Jeph Loeb and penciled by Marko Djurdjevic and Ed McGuinness, 2008)
Ultimate Spider-Man Annual #1–2 (Written by Brian Michael Bendis and penciled by Mark Brooks, 2005, 2006)
Ultimate Spider-Man Annual #3 (Written by Brian Michael Bendis and penciled by David Lafuente, 2008)
Ultimate X-Men Annual #1 (Written by Brian K. Vaughan and penciled by Tom Raney, 2005)
Ultimate X-Men Annual #2 (Written by Robert Kirkman and penciled by Salvador Larroca, 2006)
Ultimate X-Men/Fantastic Four Annual #1 (Written by Aron Coliete and Joe Pokaski and penciled by Mark Brooks and Dan Panosian, 2008)

Handbooks
Official Handbook of the Ultimate Marvel Universe: Spider-Man and Fantastic Four (2005)
Official Handbook of the Ultimate Marvel Universe: X-Men and The Ultimates (2005)
Official Handbook of the Ultimate Marvel Universe: Ultimate Secrets (2008)

Novels
Tomorrow Men (2007)
Against All Enemies (2007)

See also
Ultimate Marvel

Notes

References

Lists of publications
Ultimate Marvel